Asperö is a small island and a locality situated in Göteborg Municipality, Västra Götaland County, Sweden. It had 402 inhabitants in 2010. It lies in the Southern Göteborg Archipelago.

References 

Populated places in Västra Götaland County
Southern Gothenburg Archipelago
Islands of Västra Götaland County
Populated places in Gothenburg Municipality